Halimeda discoidea is a species of calcareous green algae in the order Bryopsidales. It is commonly known as Money Plant due to its appearance and is usually found in the tropics.

Description 
Halimeda discoidea is a green colored segmented and calcified alga. This alga has a short holdfast and contains flat segments. It can get up to10 cm tall.

Habitat 
This species can be found attached to hard bottoms like reef and rocky surfaces anywhere in between 3-100ft. This alga grows better with high light intensity but it is still capable of growing with low light leves.

Distribution 
Halimeda discoidea is found widely across the tropical ocean of the world, including the Hawaiian Islands.

References

Bryopsidales
Plants described in 1842
Taxa named by Joseph Decaisne